The 1982–83 Iraqi National Clubs First Division was the 9th season of the competition since its foundation in 1974. Salahaddin won their first league title, finishing the season without defeat and clinching the title with a 1–1 draw against runners-up Al-Talaba on the final day of the season.

League table

Results

Season statistics

Top scorers

Hat-tricks

Notes
4 Player scored 4 goals

References

External links
 Iraq Football Association

Iraqi Premier League seasons
1982–83 in Iraqi football
Iraq